Gordon is the name of some places in Wisconsin in the United States:
Gordon, Ashland County, Wisconsin, a town
Gordon, Douglas County, Wisconsin, a town
Gordon (CDP), Wisconsin, a census-designated place